Moleac is a biopharmaceutical company with headquarters in Biopolis, Singapore. Moleac brings together Asian and Western techniques by identifying medicine discovered in China and developing them into Western mainstream medicine.
Moleac's first product, Neuroaid (also written NeuroAiD), derived from Traditional Chinese medicine, is focused on brain stroke recovery. It gained market approval in two countries in 2006 and a clinical trial was started in October 2007 with 1100 patients (CHIMES study). This trial was completed in August 2012, and some of its details are available at the National Institutes of Health's www.ClinicalTrial.gov site .  In this study, NeuroAid was no better than placebo in improving outcomes at 3 months in patients with acute ischemic stroke of intermediate severity.

Products and pipeline

Products
Moleac's first product, Neuroaid stroke treatment, works on the central nervous system and is derived from traditional Chinese medicine. It gained market approval in two countries in 2006 and is now present in 10 different countries, mainly in Asia and Middle-East. A clinical trial was started in October 2007 with 1100 patients (CHIMES) but failed to meet its primary clinical endpoint.

Pipeline
Moleac's pipeline is to extend NeuroAiD treatment to stroke prevention and to investigate on neurology and aging diseases.

Key partnerships
Partnerships have been entered with the following institutions:

CHIMES Society: CHIMES Society is an international academic collaboration whose objective is to establish new stroke treatments. CHIMES is a Singaporean non-profit society founded by a group of key opinion leaders in stroke, South-East Asia regional experts, and clinicians interested in implementing a research project on traditional Chinese medicine efficacy on stroke recovery. In October 2007, CHIMES Society initiated an 1100 patient clinical trial aimed at measuring the efficacy of NeuroAid in reducing neurological deficit and improving functional outcome in patients with cerebral infarction. This trial ended enrollment in 2012 and failed to meet its primary clinical endpoint.
First Teaching Hospital of Tianjin University of Traditional Chinese Medicine (Tianjin Medical University), the largest TCM hospital of China. It was established in 1954.

Awards

Frost & Sullivan Excellence in Healthcare Awards
Moleac received two awards for its Neuroaid stroke treatment. In 2009, Moleac was named Singapore Entrepreneurial Company of the Year at the Frost & Sullivan Excellence in Healthcare Awards. Frost & Sullivan granted this award to Moleac to recognise its ability to be a major player in "various healthcare segments" and to acknowledge the good practices displayed.

Biospectrum Asia Pacific Award
In 2010, Moleac was elected Asia emerging company of the year by Biospectrum. This award was granted by Biospectrum for its initiative to bridge a therapeutic gap in stroke recovery and for the rapid and efficient commercialisation of Neuroaid stroke treatment.

References

Biotechnology companies of Singapore
Science and technology in Singapore